Yan Pieter Cornelis Nasadit (born November 30, 1996) is an Indonesian professional footballer who plays as a midfielder for Liga 2 club Persipura Jayapura.

Club career

Persipura Jayapura
In 2017, Nasadit joined Liga 1 club Persipura Jayapura. He made his debut on 23 April 2017 in a match against Bali United. On 3 July 2017, Nasadit scored his first goal for Persipura in the 10th minute against Mitra Kukar at the Mandala Stadium, Jayapura.

Persija Jakarta
In 2021, Nasadit signed a contract with Indonesian Liga 2 club Persija Jakarta. He made his league debut on 31 March 2018 in a match against Arema at the Gelora Bung Karno Stadium, Jakarta.

Kalteng Putra
In middle season 2019, Nasadit signed a contract with Indonesian Liga 1 club Kalteng Putra. He made his league debut on 24 September 2019 in a match against PSIS Semarang at the Tuah Pahoe Stadium, Palangka Raya.

Persis Solo
He was signed for Persis Solo to play in Liga 2 in the 2020 season. This season was suspended on 27 March 2020 due to the COVID-19 pandemic. The season was abandoned and was declared void on 20 January 2021.

Persiba Balikpapan
In 2021, Nasadit signed a contract with Indonesian Liga 2 club Persiba Balikpapan. He made his league debut on 6 October against Kalteng Putra at the Tuah Pahoe Stadium, Palangka Raya.

Honours

Club

Persija Jakarta
 Liga 1: 2018
 Indonesia President's Cup: 2018

References

External links 
Yan Nasadit at Soccerway

1996 births
Living people
Indonesian footballers
Kalteng Putra F.C. players
Association football midfielders
Persipura Jayapura players
Persija Jakarta players
People from Jayapura
Sportspeople from Papua